Kelvin Matthews (born 15 December 1953) is a former Australian rules footballer. He is the brother of Leigh Matthews, whom he played with at Hawthorn. Kelvin was a centreman and was a member of the Hawks' 1976 premiership side.

Slightly smaller than his brother, Kelvin was heavier and skilful enough to represent Victoria in an interstate game in 1974.

In a match against Fitzroy in 1977, Kelvin kicked eight goals and Leigh six.

Kelvin also did Aussie Rules coaching sessions in the Riverina township of Ganmain in the 1970s.

External links
 

1953 births
Australian rules footballers from Melbourne
Hawthorn Football Club players
Hawthorn Football Club Premiership players
Geelong Football Club players
Chelsea Football Club (Australia) players
Living people
One-time VFL/AFL Premiership players
People from Frankston, Victoria